Gudeodiscus emigrans is a species of air-breathing land snail, a terrestrial pulmonate gastropod mollusk in the family Plectopylidae.

Subspecies
  Gudeodiscus emigrans emigrans (Möllendorff, 1901)
  Gudeodiscus emigrans quadrilamellatus Páll-Gergely, 2013
 Gudeodiscus emigrans otanii Páll-Gergely & Hunyadi, 2013

Distribution
The distribution of Gudeodiscus emigrans was described from "Mẫu Sơn Mountains" within Lạng Sơn Province, Vietnam. It also occur in Bắc Kạn Province, Tuyên Quang Province, and in Tam Đảo between Thái Nguyên Province and Vĩnh Phúc Province.

Ecology
It is a ground-dwelling species as all other plectopylid snails in Vietnam.

Gudeodiscus emigrans quadrilamellatus co-occur with other plectopylids in Vietnam: with Gudeodiscus anceyi. Gudeodiscus fischeri live at geographically close sites to Gudeodiscus emigrans quadrilamellatus.

References

External links

Plectopylidae
Gastropods described in 1901